
This is a list of typefaces shipped with Windows 3.1x through Windows 11. Typefaces only shipped with Microsoft Office or other Microsoft applications are not included.  The "Included with" column indicates the first edition of Windows in which the font was included.

See also
 List of typefaces
 List of typefaces included with macOS
 Core fonts for the Web
 Unicode font

References

External links
 Revised (cross-platform) font stack (for the web)

Typeface samples
Microsoft Windows
Typefaces
Microsoft typefaces